Rimmington may refer to:

 Edith Rimmington, English artist, poet and photographer
 Nathan Rimmington, Australian cricketer
 Norman Rimmington, English footballer 
 Rebecca Rimmington, English cyclist 
 Rikki-Lee Rimmington, Australian cricketer
 Russ Rimmington, former Mayor of Hamilton, New Zealand

See also
 Rimington (disambiguation)
 The Rivingtons, a 1960s band
 The Rippingtons, an American contemporary jazz group